Band of Joy (sometimes known as Robert Plant and the Band of Joy) was an English rock band. Various line-ups of the group performed from 1965 to 1968 and from 1977 to 1983. Robert Plant revived the band's name in 2010 for a concert tour of North America and Europe.

The band is notable for including two musicians, Robert Plant and John Bonham, who went on to join Led Zeppelin, as well as Dave Pegg, who would become a member of both Fairport Convention and Jethro Tull; and, to a lesser degree, because the band's one-time roadie was Noddy Holder, who later went on to front the band Slade.

1966–1968

Band of Joy was originally formed in 1966 in West Bromwich, near Birmingham, England by Chris Brown (keyboards), Vernon Pereira (guitar), and singer Robert Plant. Conflicts with the band's management led to Plant leaving the group after a few months. Band of Joy, at one time, featured John Elson. A third incarnation of the band, including Plant's friend John Bonham (they had met only two years earlier in late 1965 when Bonham joined The Crawling King Snakes) lasted from 1967 to mid-1968. This line-up included Kevyn Gammond on guitar and Paul Lockey on bass. Their brand of soul and blues was popular with Birmingham mods. This line-up recorded a number of demo recordings in early 1968, but broke up in May 1968 when a recording contract failed to materialise.

Albeit briefly, lead guitar duties were taken by Dave Pegg, who later played the bass guitar with Fairport Convention and Jethro Tull. Pegg rehearsed with Band of Joy but did not tour with them.

For a 1968 tour of Scotland, Plant and Bonham co-opted bassist John Hill (ex-Uncle Joseph) and guitarist Mick Strode to fill in a temporary line-up.

1977–1983

In 1977 Gammond and Paul Lockey revived Band of Joy, rounding out the line-up with John Pasternak, Peter Robinson, and keyboardist Michael Chetwood. Gammond, Lockey, Pasternak and Robinson had previously played in Bronco. The two albums recorded under this line-up went on to define the trademark cult sound of the band, with progressive melodies, blues hooks and experimentation with new sounds blending the sounds of the punk movement with classic genres of rock, blues and progressive influences. The group released a second album in 1983 before breaking up.

Gammond later worked with Plant in his group Priory of Brion.

2010–2011

In 2010 it was announced that Plant would form a new band, record an album and tour as Robert Plant & the Band of Joy. The album was number 8 on Rolling Stones list of the 30 Best Albums of 2010.

In October 2010 the band appeared, alongside the London Oriana Choir at the Roundhouse, London for a special performance at the BBC Radio 2 Electric Proms.

Discography
 Band of Joy (1978)
 24k (1983)
 Sixty Six to Timbuktu (2003) – Robert Plant retrospective album; includes some Band of Joy recordings, more specifically the covers "Hey Joe" by The Jimi Hendrix Experience and "For What It's Worth" by Buffalo Springfield.
 Band of Joy (2010)

Personnel

Members

Robert Plant – vocals (1966, 1967–1968, 2010–2011)
Chris Brown – keyboards (1966, 1967–1968)
Vernon Pereira – guitar (1966)
John Bonham – drums (1967–1968; died 1980)
Paul Lockey – bass, guitar, vocals (1967–1968, 1977–1983)
Kevyn Gammond – guitar, vocals (1967–1968, 1977–1983)
Dave Pegg – guitar (1968)
John Hill – bass (1968)
John Kelsey – keyboards (1968)

Mick Strode – guitar (1968)
Michael Chetwood – keyboards, vocals (1977–1983)
John Pasternak – bass, vocals (1977–1983; died 1986)
Peter Robinson – drums (1977–1983)
Marco Giovino – drums, percussion, vocals (2010–2011)
Patty Griffin – vocals, guitar (2010–2011)
Byron House – bass (2010–2011)
Buddy Miller – guitar, vocals (2010–2011)
Darrell Scott – vocals, mandolin, guitar, accordion, pedals, lap steel guitar, banjo (2010–2011)

Lineups

See also
British rock
Music of the United Kingdom

References

Further reading
Hornby, Laurie. Brum Rocked On! (Solihull: TGM Limited, 2003) 
 – Achilles Last Stand (1992). (Retrieved 18 August 2005.)
Yorke, Ritchie. Led Zeppelin: The Definitive Biography (London: Virgin, 1993) 

Robert Plant
1966 establishments in England
British folk rock groups
English blues rock musical groups
English progressive rock groups
Musical groups from Birmingham, West Midlands
Musical groups established in 1966
Musical groups disestablished in 1968
Musical groups reestablished in 1977
Musical groups disestablished in 1983
Musical groups reestablished in 2010